Arief Yahya (born 2 April 1961 in Banyuwangi) is the former Minister of Tourism of Indonesia between 2014 and 2019 in the Working Cabinet of President Joko Widodo. Prior to becoming a minister, he had been the CEO at state-owned Telkom Indonesia between 2012 and his appointment.

Background
Yahya was born in Banyuwangi, East Java on 2 March 1961, his father a merchant while her mother was a stay-at-home parent. At the age of 18, he was admitted to the Bandung Institute of Technology to study electrical engineering. Later, he would receive a scholarship from his workplace to study at Surrey University. He continued to earn his doctorate at Padjadjaran University, graduating with a business management degree in 2014.

Career

Telkom
He started working at Telkom Indonesia in 1986. There, he gradually rose up the corporate ranks, at points becoming head of a local office, a regional division, then becoming a director of enterprise and wholesale.

In 2012, he was appointed by the government as CEO, replacing Rinaldi Firmansyah.

Minister of Tourism
He was appointed minister of tourism by newly elected Joko Widodo in 2014. In 2015, his ministry set a target to have 20 million foreign visitors by 2019, with visits that year numbering around 9 million per year. By 2017, the number had increased to 14 million.

References

1961 births
Living people
Bandung Institute of Technology alumni
Alumni of the University of Surrey
Government ministers of Indonesia
People from Banyuwangi Regency
Working Cabinet (Joko Widodo)